The Baltimore and Ohio Railroad  was the first common carrier railroad and the oldest railroad in the United States with its first section opening in 1830. Merchants from Baltimore, which had benefited to some extent from the construction of the National Road early in the century, wanted to do business with settlers crossing the Appalachian Mountains. The railroad faced competition from several existing and proposed enterprises, including the  Albany-Schenectady Turnpike, built in 1797, the Erie Canal, which opened in 1825, and the Chesapeake and Ohio Canal. At first, the B&O was located entirely in the state of Maryland; its original line extending from the port of Baltimore west to Sandy Hook, Maryland, opened in 1834. There it connected with Harper's Ferry, first by boat, then by the Wager Bridge, across the Potomac River into Virginia, and also with the navigable Shenandoah River.

Because of competition with the C&O Canal for trade with coal fields in western Maryland, the railroad could not use the C&O right-of-way west of Harpers Ferry. To continue westward through the Appalachian Mountains, the B&O built the B & O Railroad Potomac River Crossing (1837) at Harpers Ferry, Virginia (since 1863, West Virginia). The line continued through Virginia to a point just west of the junction of Patterson Creek and the North Branch Potomac River, where it crossed back into Maryland to reach Cumberland (1842), connecting with the National Road, the main route westward. It reached the Ohio River at Moundsville, Virginia (1852), Wheeling (1853), where it built a terminus, and in 1857 to Parkersburg, Virginia, below rapids which made navigation difficult during parts of the year. It proved crucial to Union success during the American Civil War, which caused considerable damage to the system. After the war, the B&O consolidated several feeder lines in Virginia and West Virginia, and expanded westward into Ohio, Indiana and Illinois. B&O advertising later carried the motto: "Linking 13 Great States with the Nation."

The B&O also included the Leiper Railroad, the first permanent horse-drawn railroad in the U.S. At the end of 1970, the B&O operated 5,552 miles of road and 10,449 miles of track, not including the Staten Island Rapid Transit (SIRT) or the Reading and its subsidiaries. It included the oldest operational railroad bridge in the United States, the Carrollton Viaduct. After a series of mergers in the 20th century, the B&O became part of the CSX Transportation (CSX) network in 1987.

When CSX established the B&O Railroad Museum as a separate entity from the corporation, it donated some of the former B&O Mount Clare Shops in Baltimore, including the Mt. Clare roundhouse, to the museum, while selling the rest of the property. The B&O Warehouse at the Camden Yards rail junction in Baltimore now dominates the view over the right-field wall at the Baltimore Orioles' current home, Oriole Park at Camden Yards.

The B&O owes its fame, in part, to its inclusion as one of the four featured railroads in the original version of the popular board game Monopoly; it is the only railroad on the board that did not directly serve Atlantic City, New Jersey, the city whose street names were used in the game's original edition.

History

Ohio
The railroad did not reach the Ohio River until 1852, 24 years after the project started. Yet the Ohio was from the beginning the destination the railroad was seeking to link with Baltimore, at the time a railroad center. By crossing the Appalachian Mountains, a technical challenge, it would link the new and booming territories of what at the time was the West—particularly Ohio, Indiana, and Kentucky—with the east coast rail and boat network, from Maryland northward. (There was no rail link between Maryland and Virginia until the B&O opened the Harpers Ferry bridge in 1839.)

Starting in 1825, the Erie Canal provided an animal-powered water facility connecting New York City with Ohio via Lake Erie. It took ten days to travel from Buffalo to New York City. The Cumberland Road, later the beginning of the National Road, federally financed, provided a road link for animal-powered transport between Cumberland, Maryland (on the Potomac River) and Wheeling, Virginia (today part of West Virginia, on the Ohio River) when completed in 1837; it was the second paved road in the country.

In New York, political support for the Erie Canal detracted from the prospect of building a railroad to replace it, whose full length did not open until 1844. Mountains in Pennsylvania made construction in the western part of the state expensive and technically challenging, and the Pennsylvania Railroad, linking Pittsburgh and Philadelphia, did not open its full length until 1852, and there was no rail link west from Pittsburgh to Ohio for several more years.

The fast-growing port city of Baltimore, Maryland, faced economic stagnation unless it opened a route to the western states. On February 27, 1827, twenty-five merchants and bankers studied the best means of restoring "that portion of the Western trade which has recently been diverted from it by the introduction of steam navigation." Their answer was to build a railroad—one of the first commercial lines in the world.

Their plans worked well, despite many political problems from canal backers and other railroads. For example, only the Pennsylvania Railroad was allowed to build in its namesake state, requiring the B&O to skirt around a corner of the state, even though the Pennsylvania Railroad didn't even operate in that area of Pennsylvania.

The railroad grew from a capital base of $3 million in 1827 to a large enterprise generating $2.7 million of annual profit on its  of track in 1854, with 19 million passenger miles. The railroad fed tens of millions of dollars of shipments to and from Baltimore and its growing hinterland to the west, thus making the city the commercial and financial capital of the region south of Philadelphia.

Charters
Two men—Philip E. Thomas and George Brown—were the pioneers of the railroad. They spent the year 1826 investigating railway enterprises in England, which were at that time being tested in a comprehensive fashion as commercial ventures. Their investigation completed, they held an organizational meeting on February 12, 1827, including about twenty-five citizens, most of whom were Baltimore merchants or bankers. Chapter 123 of the 1826 Session Laws of Maryland, passed February 28, 1827, and the Commonwealth of Virginia on March 8, 1827, chartered the Baltimore and Ohio Rail Road Company, with the task of building a railroad from the port of Baltimore west to a suitable point on the Ohio River. The railroad, formally incorporated April 24, was intended to provide a faster route for Midwestern goods to reach the East Coast then to the hugely successful but slow Erie Canal across upstate New York. Thomas was elected as the first president and Brown the treasurer. The capital of the proposed company was fixed at five million dollars,
but the B&O was initially capitalized in 1827 with a three million dollar issue of stock. Half of this stock was reserved for the Maryland state government and the municipal government of Baltimore, which invested $1,000,000 and $500,000, respectively, in the new company. Around twenty-two thousand people—a quarter of the city's population—bought the remaining private equity.

Early construction and legal battles

Construction began on July 4, 1828, when Charles Carroll of Carrollton (the last living signer of the Declaration of Independence) performed the groundbreaking by laying the cornerstone. The initial tracks were built with granite stringers topped by strap iron rails. The first section, from Baltimore west to Ellicott's Mills (now known as Ellicott City), opened on May 24, 1830. A horse pulled the first cars 26 miles and back, since the B&O did not decide to use steam power for several years. Railroad men in South Carolina had earlier commissioned a steam locomotive from a New York foundry (which would reach 25 miles per hour and became the first passenger service by locomotive), while the B&O was still experimenting with horse power and sails. The B&O's first locomotive, Tom Thumb, was made in America as a demonstrator and could pull passenger and freight cars at 18 miles per hour.

Developers decided to follow the Patapsco River to a point near Parr's Ridge (now known as Mount Airy), where the railroad would cross a height of land and descend into the valley of the Monocacy and Potomac rivers. Further extensions opened to Frederick (including the short Frederick Branch) on December 1, 1831; Point of Rocks on April 2, 1832; and Sandy Hook on December 1, 1834. Sandy Hook, Maryland, on the north shore of the Potomac, was the end of the line until the B & O Railroad Potomac River Crossing opened in 1836, linking Harpers Ferry, West Virginia (until 1863, Virginia). The connection at Harpers Ferry with the Winchester and Potomac Railroad, running southwest to Winchester, Virginia, opened in 1837, then the line northwest to Martinsburg in May 1842; Hancock in June 1842; and Cumberland, Maryland, on November 5, 1842, for some years the end of the line. The final section linked Piedmont on July 21, 1851, and Fairmont on June 22, 1852. It first reached the Ohio River at Moundsville later in 1852, and port facilities were built there. The B&O reached Wheeling, West Virginia (then part of Virginia) on January 1, 1853. That would remain the terminus through the American Civil War (apart from conflict-related outages principally between Cumberland and Martinsburg during the war) until a railroad bridge could be constructed across the Ohio River.

The narrow strip of available land along the Potomac River from Point of Rocks to Harpers Ferry caused years of legal battles between the B&O and the Chesapeake and Ohio (C&O) Canal, as both sought to exclude the other from its use. A compromise eventually allowed the two companies to share the right of way. The B&O also prevailed in a lawsuit against it by the Washington and Baltimore Turnpike Road.

The B&O wanted links to Virginia's Shenandoah Valley, as well as the parts of western Virginia draining into the Ohio River valley and ultimately the Mississippi River, such as Wheeling (where the National Road crossed the Ohio River) and the Kanawha River valley. However, many Virginia politicians wanted the minerals, timber and produce of those areas to instead ship through Richmond and reach the Atlantic through Norfolk, although the James River Canal required substantial maintenance and was never completed through the Appalachians to the Ohio River watershed. Thus, while the B&O reached Wheeling in 1853, political compromises meant the B&O would only reach Grafton to connect to Parkersburg on the Ohio River through a connection with the Northwestern Virginia Railroad which was completed in 1857. During the "Great Railway Celebrations of 1857", a large group of notables boarded the B&O in Baltimore, then transferred to steamboats in Wheeling to Marietta, Ohio, where they boarded a railroad to Cincinnati, where after another celebration, they boarded the Ohio and Mississippi Railroad, which brought them to St. Louis, Missouri, three days after they had started their journey. The B&O would only reach Charleston (at the confluence of the Kanawha and Elk Rivers) and ultimately Huntington (which was named after a major B&O investor) on the Ohio River more than a decade after the American Civil War and the creation of the state of West Virginia.

Meanwhile, the State of Maryland granted the B&O a charter to build a line from Baltimore to Washington, D.C., in 1831, and the Washington Branch was opened in 1835. This line joined to the original mainline at Relay, Maryland, crossing the Patapsco River on the Thomas Viaduct (which remains one of the B&O's signature structures). This line was partially funded by the state of Maryland, and was operated separately until the 1870s, with Maryland receiving a 25 percent cut of gross passenger receipts. The B&O's charter also forbad further taxation of the railroad, and that no-tax provision was upheld in the 1840s after Baltimore City tried to tax it. This Washington Branch line was built in stone, much like the original mainline. By this time, however, strap rail was no longer used for new construction. Most of the stone bridges on the Old Main Line did not last long, being washed out by the periodic flooding of the Patapsco River and replaced at first by Bollman Truss bridges. The Annapolis and Elk Ridge Railroad to Annapolis connected to this line at Annapolis Junction in 1840. As an unwritten condition for the charter, it was understood that the state of Maryland would not charter any competing line between Baltimore and Washington, and no such charters were approved until well after the American Civil War, when the Pennsylvania Railroad acquired a railroad on the Delmarva Peninsula, which had the power to build short branch lines, so it was able to connect to Washington through Bowie, Maryland.

The B&O also wanted access to Pittsburgh and coal fields in western Pennsylvania and Ohio. Although the directors of the Pennsylvania Railroad wanted a monopoly in their state, delays in laying track to Pittsburgh led the Pennsylvania legislature in 1846 to require construction to be completed within 10 years, else competition would be allowed. The Pennsylvania Railroad finished its trans-Allegheny track with two years to spare, thus the B&O would only be able to extend its tracks up the Youghiogheny River valley to the soft coal fields in 1871.

Early engineering

When construction began on the B&O in the 1820s, railroad engineering was in its infancy. Unsure exactly which materials would suffice, the B&O erred on the side of sturdiness and built many of its early structures of granite. Even the track bed to which iron strap rail was affixed consisted of the stone.

Though the granite soon proved too unforgiving and expensive for track, most of the B&O's monumental bridges have survived to this day, and many are still in active railroad use by CSX. Baltimore's Carrollton Viaduct, named in honor of Charles Carroll of Carrollton, was the B&O's first bridge, and is the oldest railway bridge in the Americas still carrying trains (and the third oldest in the world, after the Skerne Bridge, Darlington, UK, of 1824–1825, and the Bassaleg Viaduct, Newport, UK, of 1826). The Thomas Viaduct at Relay, Maryland, was the longest bridge in the United States upon its completion in 1835. It also remains in use. The B&O made extensive use of the Bollman iron truss bridge design in the mid-19th century. Its durability and ease of assembly aided faster railroad construction.

As the B&O built the main line west to Parr's Ridge, near Mount Airy, Maryland, it had limited information about the capabilities of steam locomotives; at the time, the line had three, the York, Atlantic, and the Franklin. When planning the extension to Sandy Hook, Maryland, and then Harpers Ferry, the company was uncertain if the engines' metal wheels would grip the metal rails sufficiently to pull a train up to the top of the ridge. The railroad decided to construct two inclined planes, one on each side of the ridge, along which teams of horses, and perhaps steam-powered winches, would assist pulling the trains uphill. The planes, about a mile long on each side, quickly proved an operational bottleneck. Before the decade of the 1830s ended, the B&O built a  alternate route that became known as the Mount Airy Loop. The planes were quickly abandoned and forgotten, though some artifacts survive to the present.

First telegraph line
In 1843, Congress appropriated $30,000 for construction of an experimental  telegraph line between Washington, D.C., and Baltimore along the B&O's right-of-way. The B&O approved the project with the agreement that the railroad would have free use of the line upon its completion. An impressive demonstration occurred on May 1, 1844, when news of the Whig Party's nomination of Henry Clay for U.S. president was telegraphed from the party's convention in Baltimore to the Capitol Building in Washington. On May 24, 1844, the line was officially opened as Samuel F. B. Morse sent his famous words, "What hath God wrought", from the B&O's Mount Clare station to the Capitol by telegraph.

Innovations
Contrary to legend, the B&O was not the first chartered railroad in the United States; John Stevens obtained a charter for the New Jersey Railroad in 1815. The B&O was, however, the first company to operate a locomotive built in America, with the Tom Thumb in 1829. It built the first passenger and freight station (Mount Clare in 1829) and was the first railroad to earn passenger revenues in December 1829, and publish a timetable on May 23, 1830. On Christmas Eve 1852, the B&O line was completed between Baltimore and the Ohio River near Moundsville, West Virginia.

Conflicts in the early years

Partial government ownership caused some operational problems. Of the thirty members on its board of directors, twelve were elected by shareholders, while eighteen were appointed either by Maryland or the Baltimore City Council. Many had conflicting interests: the directors appointed by the state and city desired low fares and all construction to be funded from corporate revenues, while the directors elected by shareholders desired greater profits and dividends. These conflicts became more intense in the 1850s after the completion of the C&O Canal, which brought additional competition to the B&O. In 1853, after being nominated by large shareholder and director Johns Hopkins, John W. Garrett became president of the B&O, a position he would hold until his death in 1884. In the first year of his presidency, corporate operating costs were reduced from 65 percent of revenues to 46 percent, and the railroad began distributing profits to its shareholders.

John Brown's raid on Harpers Ferry

The B&O played a major role, and got national attention, in the response to abolitionist John Brown's raid on Harpers Ferry, Virginia (since 1863, West Virginia), in October 1859. Black porter Hayward Shepherd, to whom there is a monument in Harpers Ferry, was the first man killed; stationmaster Fontaine Beckham, who was also the town's mayor, was killed the next day. Raiders had cut the telegraph line, and stopped the 1:30 AM Wheeling to Baltimore express, but after several hours the train was allowed to continue and at the first station with a working telegraph (Monocacy) the conductor sent a telegram to B&O headquarters. After confirming from the Martinsburg station (via Wheeling, because of the cut telegraph line) that the report was not a hoax, Garrett telegraphed President James Buchanan, the Secretary of War, the Governor of Virginia, and Maryland Militia General George Hume Steuart about the insurrection in progress. The B&O made its rolling stock available to the military. At 3:20 p.m. a train left Washington Depot with 87 U.S. Marines and two howitzers, and a 3:45 p.m. train from nearer Frederick, Maryland, carried three Maryland militia companies under Col. Edward Shriver. These trains stopped before the bridge at Sandy Hook, Maryland (end of the line before the bridge was built), and troops continued across the bridge on foot. Soon Garrett's Master of Transportation William Prescott Smith left Baltimore City, together with Maryland Gen. Charles G. Egerton Jr. and the Second Light Brigade, which train also picked up the Marines on the federal troop train at the junction in Relay, Maryland. All awaited Lt.Col. Robert E. Lee and Lt. J.E.B. Stuart, who had received orders from the Secretary of War to retake Harpers Ferry and capture the insurgent abolitionists, which they quickly did. Garrett reported with evident relief the next day that aside from the cut telegraph line, which was quickly repaired, there had been no damage to any B&O track, equipment, or facilities.

The government of Maryland published in a book the many telegrams sent by B&O employees and management during the raid.

American Civil War
Although many Marylanders had Southern sympathies, Garrett and Hopkins supported the Union. The B&O became crucial to the Federal government during the Civil War, being the main rail connection between Washington, D.C., and the northern states, especially west of the Appalachian mountains.

However, its initial problem became Lincoln's first Secretary of War, Simon Cameron, a major stockholder in the rival North Central Railroad, which received long haul freight destined for Baltimore from the rival Pennsylvania Railroad. Furthermore, the Pennsylvania Railroad and other investors sought permission to construct rail lines which threatened the B&O's monopolies on the Washington Branch (between Relay and Washington DC) and westward through Cumberland, Maryland. Raids and battles during the war also cost the B&O substantial losses, many never indemnified. Master of Transportation Prescott Smith kept a diary during the war years, describing incidents such as the June 1861 derailment of a 50 car coal train, which plunged into a ravine after a bridge was destroyed (the wreckage burned for months and melted the metal coal hoppers), as well as later ironclad trains (one only disabled by an artillery shell piercing the boiler).

1861–1862 
On April 18, 1861, the day after Virginia seceded from the Union, Virginia militia seized the federal arsenal at Harpers Ferry, which was also an important work station on the B&O's main westward line. The following day, Confederate rioters in Baltimore attempted to prevent Pennsylvania volunteers from proceeding from the North Central Railway's Bolton station to the B&O's Mount Clare station, and Maryland's governor Hicks and Baltimore Mayor George W. Brown ordered 3 North Central and 2 Philadelphia, Wilmington and Baltimore Railroad (PW&B) bridges destroyed to prevent further federal troop movements through (and riots in) the city. Soon B&O president John Work Garrett received letters from Virginia's Governor John Letcher telling the B&O to pass no federal troops destined for any place in Virginia over the railroad, and threatening to confiscate the lines. Charles Town's mayor also wrote, threatening to cut the B&O's main line by destroying the long bridge over the Potomac River at Harpers Ferry, and Garrett also received anonymous threats. Thus he and others asked Secretary of War Cameron to protect the B&O as the national capitol's main westward link. Cameron instead warned Garrett that passage of any rebel troops over his line would be treason. The Secretary of War agreed to station troops to protect the North Central, the Pennsylvania Railroad, and even the PW&B, but flatly refused to help the B&O, his main competition.

The B&O had to repair damaged line at its own expense, and often received late or no payment for services rendered to the federal government. In May, CSA Colonel Jackson's operations against the B&O Railroad (1861) began. Stonewall Jackson initially permitted B&O trains to operate during limited hours over the approximately 100 miles from Point of Rocks to Cumberland. On June 20, 1861, Jackson's Confederates seized Martinsburg, a major B&O work center, having blown up the Harpers Ferry railroad bridge on June 14. Confederates confiscated dozens of locomotives and train cars and ripped up double track in order to ship rails for Confederate use in Virginia (14 locomotives and 83 rail cars were dismantled and sent south, and another 42 locomotives and 386 rail cars damaged or destroyed at Martinsburg, with the B&O water station and machine shops also destroyed and  miles of telegraph wire removed by the time federal control was restored in March 1862).

Since Jackson cut the B&O main line into Washington for more than six months, the North Central and Pennsylvania Railroads profited from overflow traffic, even as many B&O trains stood idle in Baltimore. Garrett tried to use his government contacts to secure the needed protection, from Maryland Delegate Reverdy Johnson to General George McClellan and Treasury Secretary Salmon P. Chase. As winter began, coal prices soared in Washington, even though the B&O in September arranged for free coal transport from its Cumberland, Maryland, terminal down the C&O Canal (which reduced prices somewhat, although Confederates also damaged the C&O canal that winter). Furthermore, western farmers could not get their produce to markets because of the B&O shutdown, only partially alleviated by the summer 1861 Union army victories at the Battle of Philippi (West Virginia) and Rich Mountain, and vigorous army and company work crews which reduced the main-line gap to 25 miles between Harpers Ferry and Back Creek.

Finally at year end, Samuel M. Felton, the PW&B President, wrote newspapers about the War Department's discrimination against his cooperating railroad line, which competed with Cameron's favored North Central and Pennsylvania Railroads. President Lincoln (familiar with railroad law since his days as an Illinois lawyer) in January 1862 replaced Cameron with Pennsylvania lawyer Edwin M. Stanton, who had been serving as Cameron's legal advisor. Furthermore, on January 31, 1862, Congress passed the Railways and Telegraph Act of January 31, 1862, creating the United States Military Railroad and allowing it to seize and operate any railroad or telegraph company's equipment, although Stanton and USMRR Superintendent Daniel McCallum would take a "team of rivals" approach to railroad management and allow civilian operations to continue. In February 1862, Union forces recaptured Martinsburg and Harpers Ferry, and work crews continued replacing wrecked bridges and equipment, although bushwhacker raids continued.
Even then train movements were sporadic and subject to frequent stoppages, derailments, capture and attack. Prominent raids on the B&O railroad during this period were:
 The Great Train Raid of 1861, May 22 – June 23, 1861
 The Romney Expedition, January 1 through January 24, 1862
 Operations during the Maryland Campaign, September 8, 1862
 Various raids of Brigadier General A. G. Jenkins, Fall, 1862

{| class="wikitable"
|+ B&O Locomotives Captured During the Great Train Raid of 1861
! Engine Name!!Eng. No.!!Type
|-
! ?
| No. 17
| Norris 4-2-0
|-
! ?
| No. 34
| Mason 4-4-0
|-
! ?
| No. 187
| Camel 0-8-0
|-
! Lady Davis (CSA name)
| No. 188
| Tyson 4-4-0 "Dutch Wagon"
|-
! ?
| No. 193
| Camel 0-8-0
|-
! ?
| No. 198
| Hayes Camel 0-8-0
|-
! ?
| No. 199
| Camel 0-8-0
|-
! ?
| No. 201
| ?
|-
|}

1863–1865

The second half of the Civil War was characterized by near-continuous raiding, which severely hampered the Union defense of Washington, D.C. Union forces and leaders often failed to properly secure the region, despite the B&O's vital importance to the Union cause.

This military strategy, or lack thereof, allowed Confederate commanders to contribute significantly to the length of the war, by conducting free-ranging military operations against the region and railroad.

Before the Battle of Monocacy, B&O agents began reporting Confederate troop movements eleven days prior to the battle, and Garrett had their intelligence passed to authorities in the War Department and to Major General Lew Wallace, who commanded the department responsible for defense of the area. As preparations for the battle progressed, the B&O provided transport for federal troops and munitions, and on two occasions Garrett was contacted directly by President Abraham Lincoln for further information. Though Union forces lost this battle, the delay allowed Ulysses S. Grant to successfully repel the Confederate attack on Washington at the Battle of Fort Stevens two days later. After the battle, Lincoln paid tribute to Garrett as:

 The Jones-Imboden Raid, April 24 through May 22, 1863
 The Catoctin Station Raid, June 17, 1863
 The First Calico Raid, June 19, 1863
 The B&O Raid on Duffield Station, January 1864
 The McNeill Raid, May 5, 1864
 The Second Calico Raid, July 3, 1864
 The Battle of Monocacy, July 9, 1864
 Gilmor's Raid, July 11, 1864
 The Greenback Raid, by Mosby's Rangers on October 14, 1864
 The B&O Raid on Duffield Station II, January 1865
 Gilmor's B&O Raid, February 1865
 The B&O Derailment Raid, March 1865

The Confederate leaders who led these operations and specifically targeted the railroad included:
 Lieutenant General Thomas J. "Stonewall" Jackson and many units under his command
 Lieutenant General Jubal Anderson Early and many units under his command
 Brigadier General Turner Ashby and his "Black Horse" cavalry
 Brigadier General John D. Imboden and the 62nd Virginia Mounted Infantry (1st Partisan Rangers)
 Brigadier General Albert G. Jenkins and the 8th Virginia Cavalry
 Brigadier General William E. "Grumble" Jones and the "Laurel Brigade"
 Colonel John S. Mosby's "Mosby's Rangers"
 Major Harry Gilmor's "Gilmor's Raiders"
 Captain John H. McNeill's "McNeill's Rangers"

Bases of operation involved in raiding the B&O Railroad:
 Winchester, Virginia
 Harpers Ferry, West Virginia

Westward by merger

A steel and stone bridge was built across the Ohio River between Bellaire, Ohio, and Wheeling, West Virginia, in 1871, connecting the B&O to the Central Ohio Railroad, which the B&O had leased starting in 1866. This provided a direct rail connection to Columbus, Ohio, and the lease marked the beginning of a series of expansions to the west and north.

Other railroads included in the B&O were:

 Winchester and Potomac Railroad and Winchester and Strasburg Railroad from 1867. This pair of lines connected with the B&O at Harper's Ferry, West Virginia, and constituted the only significant B&O trackage in present-day Virginia.
 Sandusky, Mansfield and Newark Railroad leased through the Central Ohio in 1869
 Pittsburgh and Connellsville Railroad from 1871. This was the B&O entry into Pittsburgh, thwarting the denial of a Pennsylvania charter to the B&O.
 Somerset and Cambria Railroad from 1879
 Buffalo Railroad from 1880
 Pittsburgh Southern Railroad acquired 1883. Originally a narrow gauge railroad, it was converted to standard gauge and renamed the Baltimore & Ohio Short Line.
 West Virginia and Pittsburgh Railroad from 1890
 Columbus and Cincinnati Midland Railroad leased through the Central Ohio in 1890
 Monongahela River Railroad from 1900
 Marietta and Cincinnati Railroad from 1882. This was initially renamed the Cincinnati, Washington and Baltimore Railroad and then again to the Baltimore and Ohio Southwestern Railroad in 1889. The B&OSW absorbed the Ohio and Mississippi Railroad in 1893, giving the B&O a connection to St. Louis, Missouri, and finally the B&OSW disappeared into the rest of the system in 1900.

 Ohio River Railroad from 1901
 Pittsburgh Junction Railroad from 1902
 Pittsburgh and Western Railroad from 1902. This was originally a narrow gauge system which was standard gauged from 1883 to 1911. It formed the main B&O line west from Pittsburgh. The line passed the Mars Train Station in Mars, Pennsylvania, northwest of Pittsburgh.
 Cleveland, Terminal and Valley Railway from 1895. This was the B&O's entry into Cleveland, Ohio.
 Cleveland, Lorain and Wheeling Railroad from 1909
 Chicago Terminal Transfer Company, reorganized in 1910 as the Baltimore and Ohio Chicago Terminal Railroad. This switching line was always operated as a separate company.
 Salisbury Railroad near Pittsburgh, operated from 1912
 Cincinnati, Hamilton and Dayton Railroad from 1912
 Morgantown and Kingwood Railroad from 1920
 Coal and Coke Railway from 1916
 Cincinnati, Indianapolis and Western Railroad from 1927. This was originally part of the Cincinnati, Hamilton and Dayton, and gave the B&O a connection to Springfield, Illinois.
 Buffalo, Rochester and Pittsburgh Railway in 1932. This gave the B&O a line into New York state.
 Buffalo and Susquehanna Railroad from 1932. Part of the line was severed from the rest of the system by flooding, and became part of the Wellsville, Addison and Galeton Railroad in 1955.

(This list omits certain short lines.)

The Chicago and Alton Railroad was purchased by the B&O in 1931 and renamed the Alton Railroad. It was always operated separately and was eventually bought by the Gulf, Mobile and Ohio Railroad after receivership in 1942.

Great Railroad Strike of 1877

As a result of poor national economic conditions in the mid-1870s following the Panic of 1873, the B&O attempted to reduce its workers' wages. After a second reduction in wages was announced in the same year, workers began the Great Railroad Strike of 1877 on July 14 in Martinsburg, West Virginia. Striking workers would not allow any of the trains, mainly freight trains, to roll until the third wage cut was revoked. West Virginia Governor Henry M. Mathews sent in state militia units to restore train service but the soldiers refused to fire on the strikers. The strike spread to Cumberland, and when Maryland Governor John Lee Carroll attempted to put down the strike by sending the state militia from Baltimore, riots broke out resulting in 11 deaths, the burning of parts of Camden station, and damage to several engines and cars. The next day workers in Pittsburgh staged a sympathy strike that was also met with an assault by the state militia; Pittsburgh then erupted into widespread rioting. The strike ended after federal troops and state militias restored order.

New lines in Maryland

In 1866 the B&O began constructing the Metropolitan Branch west out of Washington, which was completed in 1873 after years of erratic effort. Before this line was laid, rail traffic west of Washington had to travel first to Relay or Baltimore before joining the main line. The line cut a more or less straight line from Washington to Point of Rocks, Maryland, with many grades and large bridges. Upon the opening of this line, through passenger traffic was rerouted through Washington, and the Old Main Line from Point of Rocks to Relay was reduced to secondary status as far as passenger service was concerned. The Washington to Gaithersburg section of the Met Branch was double-tracked during 1886–1893. Rebuilding in the early 20th century and complete double-tracking of the branch by 1928 increased capacity; the "branches" became the de facto mainline, though the Old Main Line was retained as a relief route.

Meanwhile, the Pennsylvania Railroad (PRR) outmaneuvered the B&O to acquire the B&O's northern connection, the Philadelphia, Wilmington and Baltimore Railroad in the early 1880s, cutting off the B&O's access to Philadelphia and New York. The projected route, passing through what is now Bowie, Maryland, could have a "branch" constructed that would allow service into Washington. The Pennsylvania picked up the charter through the agency of the Baltimore and Potomac Railroad and in 1872 service between Baltimore and Washington began. (See Pope's Creek Subdivision.) At the same time, the PRR outmaneuvered the B&O and took control of the Long Bridge across the Potomac River into Virginia, the B&O's connection to southern lines.

In response, the B&O chartered the Philadelphia Branch in Maryland and the Baltimore and Philadelphia Railroad in Delaware and Pennsylvania and built a parallel route, finished in 1886. The 10th president, Charles F. Mayer, spearheaded the development of the Baltimore Belt Line, which opened in 1895, and recruited engineer Samuel Rea to design it. This belt line connected the main line to the Philadelphia Branch without the need for a car ferry across the Patapsco River, but the cost of constructing the Howard Street Tunnel drove the B&O to bankruptcy in 1896.

Two other lines were built in attempts to reconnect to the south. The Alexandria Branch (now called the Alexandria Extension) was built in 1874, starting from Hyattsville, Maryland, and ending at a ferry operation at Shepherd's Landing. The ferry operation continued until 1901 when the trackage rights agreement concluded as part of the construction of Washington Union Station saw the south end of the branch realigned to link to the PRR trackage in Anacostia, across the Anacostia Railroad Bridge, into the Virginia Avenue Tunnel, through Southwest Washington, D.C., to Potomac Yard in Alexandria, Virginia. (See RF&P Subdivision.) The Alexandria Branch trackage to Shepherd's Landing was heavily used during World War II when traffic congestion on the Long Bridge caused the U.S. Army Corps of Engineers to construct a bridge along the original plan of the B&O: Alexandria to Shepherd's Landing, Washington. Trains of empty freight cars were routed north and south over the structure, which was demolished after the end of World War II.

Before either connection was made, however, another branch was built around the west side of Washington. During the 1880s the B&O had organised a group of bankrupt railroads in Virginia into the Virginia Midland Railroad. The VM track ran from Alexandria to Danville, Virginia. The line projected west across the Potomac River was intended to cross the Potomac just north of the D.C. line, to continue southwest to a connection with the B&O-controlled Virginia Midland (VM) in Fairfax (now Fairfax Station, to distinguish it from what was Fairfax Court House and is now the City of Fairfax, Virginia), and if possible to a connection with the Richmond, Fredericksburg and Potomac Railroad in Quantico. The branch was started in 1892 and reached Chevy Chase, Maryland, the same year. Financial problems in both the VM and B&O forced a halt to construction and led to the B&O's loss of control of the VM. Following bankruptcy, and control by the Pennsylvania Railroad, by the time the line was completed in 1910 there was no longer any point to the river crossing. Thus, the renamed Georgetown Branch came to serve a wide range of customers in Maryland and in Georgetown, such as the Potomac Electric Power Company, the Washington Milling Company, and the U.S. government. The line cut directly across various creeks, and includes what was said to be the longest wood trestle on the railroad over Rock Creek; and a short tunnel, Dalecarlia Tunnel, under the Washington Aqueduct. The line was almost completely abandoned in 1986 by CSX and is presently used in part as the right-of-way for the Capital Crescent Trail.

After a flood damaged the C&O Canal in 1877, the B&O acquired a majority interest in the canal mainly to keep its property and right of way from potential use by the Western Maryland Railroad. The canal was operated by the B&O until 1924 when it was damaged in another flood. The canal's property was later transferred to the U.S. government in 1938 in consideration for obtaining a loan from the federal Reconstruction Finance Corporation.

The 20th century

Following its emergence from bankruptcy, control of the B&O was acquired by the Pennsylvania Railroad in 1901, though the two kept separate corporate identities. A rising young PRR Vice President, Leonor F. Loree, was appointed president. Loree shared the Pennsy management's belief in infrastructure and the B&O at that time needed some of that. New classes of engines were built to haul longer, heavier trains faster. The Old Main Line was reworked, sections of the original right-of-way cut off by the straightening of curves and replacement of old, weight-restricted bridges with newer, heavier bridges. Most of Loree's work on the B&O physical plant remains evident today. Many iron and steel bridges on the railroad were replaced with stone (Pennsy preferred stone to the preference of the Reading and Lackawanna Railroad for concrete). With the adoption of anti-trust legislation in 1906, the relation between the two companies was severed.

The railroad's passenger numbers were at a disadvantage with the railroad's major competitor in the northeast, the Pennsylvania Railroad. That railroad had a tunnel into Manhattan, thus carrying passengers directly into New York City. The B&O had no tunnel rights, and its New York City market trains actually terminated at the Central Railroad of New Jersey Terminal in Jersey City. From Philadelphia to Jersey City the B&O traveled over Reading Railroad tracks to Bound Brook and there joining Central Railroad of New Jersey tracks to Jersey City. Passengers rode CNJ ferries or B&O busses to Manhattan. Suffering from its weaker market position from Baltimore to New York, the B&O discontinued all passenger service north of Baltimore on April 26, 1958.  One day later, the railroad had declared itself fully dieselized.

The Chesapeake and Ohio Railway took financial control of the B&O in 1963. On May 1, 1971, Amtrak had taken over all of the remaining non-commuter routes of the B&O. The B&O already had a controlling interest in the Western Maryland Railway. In 1973 the three railroads were brought together under one corporate identity, the Chessie System, although they continued to operate as separate railroads. In 1980 the Chessie System and Seaboard Coast Line Industries, a holding company that owned the Seaboard Coast Line, the Louisville & Nashville, the Clinchfield, and the Georgia Railroad, agreed to form CSX Corporation. SCL Industries was renamed the Seaboard System Railroad (SBD) in 1983, the same year that the Western Maryland Railway was completely absorbed into the B&O. SBD was renamed CSX Transportation (CSX) in 1986. On April 30, 1987, the B&O's corporate existence ended when it was absorbed into the Chesapeake and Ohio Railway, which merged into CSX Transportation on August 31 of that year.

In railroading's golden age, the B&O was one of several trunk lines uniting the northeast quadrant of the United States into a wide industrial zone. It was the southern border as the New York Central was the northern border. The Pennsylvania Railroad controlled the center, and smaller roads like the Lackawanna, Lehigh Valley, and the Erie in the center surviving largely through the Interstate Commerce Commission. The corners of this map are Baltimore in the southeast, Boston in the northeast, Chicago in the northwest, and St. Louis in the southwest.

Locomotive roster

Baltimore and Ohio Railroad had numerous locomotives and cab units, mostly the latter. The railroad had locomotives from the following companies:
Electro-Motive Diesel
Baldwin Locomotive Works
Lima Locomotive Works
Fairbanks-Morse

Heritage units
In 2021, CSX repainted three EMD F40PHs into an honorary B&O scheme: CSX F40PH-2 1, F40PH-2 2 and F40PH-2 3.

See also

 Baltimore and Ohio Railroad Martinsburg Shops, a National Historic Landmark
 Baltimore Belt Line
 Aeolus Railroad Car
 Camden Station
 Mount Royal Station
 Mount Clare Shops
 Charles T. Hinde
 La Paz, a preserved coach that was operated by B&O

References

Citations

Cited and general references 

 
 Mileposts from:

Further reading

 
 
  Has much on the railroad's history, not just Harpers Ferry.
 
 
 
  Illustrations by Porte Crayon.

External links

 Articles about B&O arrival in Wheeling
 B&O Railroad Historical Society
 B&O Railroad Photo Tours in and around Maryland
 B&O Railroad page on the Baltimore Collective
 Baltimore & Ohio Railroad Museum
 The Baltimore and Ohio Railroad Timeline
 1827 report shows motivations of early boosters
 John W. Garrett Collection, 1850–1880  Archives Center, National Museum of American History, Smithsonian Institution.
 The Baltimore and Ohio Railroad Network
 Maryland Railroads as of 1850
 Virginia (and West Virginia) Railroads as of 1850
 List and Family Trees of North American Railroads
 B&O Whistles, Whistle museum
 Baltimore and Ohio Rail Road Station From Walnut Street Wharf Schuylkill River, June 29, 1889 by D.J. Kennedy, Historical Society of Pennsylvania

 
1827 establishments in Maryland
American companies established in 1827
Baltimore and Ohio Railroad lines
Chesapeake and Ohio Railway
Companies based in Baltimore
Defunct Delaware railroads
Defunct Illinois railroads
Defunct Indiana railroads
Defunct Kentucky railroads
Defunct Maryland railroads
Defunct Michigan railroads
Defunct Missouri railroads
Defunct New Jersey railroads
Defunct New York (state) railroads
Defunct Ohio railroads
Defunct Pennsylvania railroads
Defunct Virginia railroads
Defunct Washington, D.C., railroads
Defunct West Virginia railroads
Former Class I railroads in the United States
Predecessors of CSX Transportation
Railroads in the Chicago metropolitan area
Railway companies disestablished in 1987
Railway companies established in 1827
Railway lines opened in 1830
Standard gauge railways in the United States
Transportation in Gary, Indiana